Andrena fulvipennis is a species of mining bee in the family Andrenidae. It is found in North America.

References

Further reading

External links

 

fulvipennis
Articles created by Qbugbot
Insects described in 1853